René Demanck (born 11 December 1912) was a Belgian basketball player. He competed in the men's tournament at the 1936 Summer Olympics.

References

External links
 

1912 births
Year of death missing
Belgian men's basketball players
Olympic basketball players of Belgium
Basketball players at the 1936 Summer Olympics
People from Schaerbeek
Sportspeople from Brussels